"The Last Temptation of Homer" is the ninth episode of the fifth season of the American animated television series The Simpsons. It originally aired on the Fox network in the United States on December 9, 1993. In the episode, a female employee named Mindy is hired at the nuclear power plant. Homer and Mindy find themselves attracted to each other after bonding over their shared interests of beer, donuts and television. Although Homer is tempted to sleep with Mindy, he remains faithful to his wife Marge. Meanwhile, Bart becomes an outcast after medical treatments make him look like a nerd.

The episode was written by Frank Mula and directed by Carlos Baeza. It features cultural references to films such as The Wizard of Oz, It's A Wonderful Life, and A Christmas Carol. It did not get the usual amount of laughs at the test screenings, which made the staff worry the show was not as funny as they expected.

Since airing, the episode has received mostly positive reviews from television critics; guest star Michelle Pfeiffer was especially praised for her performance as Mindy, which was highlighted on Entertainment Weekly's list of the 16 best guest appearances on The Simpsons. It acquired a Nielsen rating of 12.7, and was the highest-rated show on the Fox network the week it aired.

Plot
After Homer and his coworkers barely escape from a gas leak at the nuclear power plant, Homer's coworker is fired when he asks Mr. Burns to put in a real emergency exit after the one they had turned out to be painted on the wall. When Burns breaks numerous labor laws in hiring a replacement — such as hiring undocumented workers and ducks — the United States Department of Labor demands that he hire at least one female worker. A beautiful woman, Mindy Simmons, is hired and Homer falls in love with her. Barney advises Homer to talk to Mindy because they will most likely have nothing in common. To his horror, Homer finds they have exactly the same interests. Marge gets sick with a bad cold, which makes her unattractive to Homer.

After playing a prank on the teachers where he paints white lines outside the school to make parking spaces 1 foot narrower than supposed to be, resulting in the teachers not being able to get out of their cars, Bart is told that for the rest of the semester that he will be asked to answer every question made first. Bart's first task is to pronounce the word "photosynthesis", but he is unable to pronounce it due to his blurry vision. He is sent to an eye doctor, who finds Bart has a lazy eye and fits him with thick glasses he must wear for two weeks. A dermatologist treats Bart's dry scalp by matting his hair down with a medicated salve, parting his hair to both sides. He receives a pair of oversized shoes from the podiatrist to help his posture, and the otolaryngologist sprays his throat, making him sound like Jerry Lewis from The Nutty Professor. These changes make Bart look and sound like a nerd, causing school bullies to pick on him. Bart eventually returns to school in his normal guise after his treatments end, but the bullies pummel him anyway.

Homer decides to tell Mindy they should avoid each other because of their mutual attraction. However, they are chosen to represent the Springfield Nuclear Power Plant at the National Energy Convention in Capital City. After a romantic dinner as an award for winning the convention, Homer and Mindy return to their hotel room. Mindy tells Homer how she feels about him, but assures him that he can decide how far their relationship will go. Although he is very tempted by her, Homer declares his faithfulness to Marge. Mindy accepts his decision and leaves after they share a kiss. Later, Marge and Homer share a romantic evening together in the same room, where Homer discovers a turkey he and Mindy left behind the bed after ordering room service. However, they are suddenly interrupted by a hotel worker who enters the room and makes suggestive noises at them. Homer silences him by punching him in the eye.

Production

The episode was written by Frank Mula and directed by Carlos Baeza. The idea was conceived by the then-show runner David Mirkin. When he was hired to work on The Simpsons, one of his goals was to study the aspect of Homer's character if he was "really tempted away" from Marge. Mirkin wanted to find out what would happen in a situation where Homer finds himself attracted to another woman. The Simpsons creator Matt Groening had previously written an episode for the show's third season, called "Colonel Homer", where Homer finds himself attracted to a country singer named Lurleen Lumpkin. In that episode, Lurleen immediately had a "crush" on Homer, but Homer was not aware of it until later on. With this episode, Mirkin wanted Homer to immediately know he was attracted to Mindy. Mirkin thought it was a "great exploration" to see what happened to Homer in this particular case.

The episode did not get the usual amount of laughs at the animatic test screening, which made the staff worry it was not as funny as they expected. Mirkin said it had to do with the fact that because there were very "subtle" performances in the episode, the animation had to be "exactly right" for it to be funny. Baeza and David Silverman, another animation director on the show, worked "hard" on the episode. Mirkin said from the very beginning it was a "huge group effort" from both the writing and the animation staff.

Many scenes in the animatic portrayed Mindy as flirty. Mirkin did not like this because the secret of the episode was Homer and Mindy are two good people who are thrown into the situation and "can't help that their libidos are going crazy upon seeing each other". He added that the two characters have "so much in common" that it is "not just a physical relationship, but a mental connection as well", and that Mindy is not a seductress but rather a woman just as nervous as Homer. Mirkin also pointed out that while Homer is being tempted by a "seemingly perfect" woman at work, his wife could not be more "imperfect" since she has got a cold and looks sick. "He's trying to connect with his family, but with Marge looking sick and Bart looking like a nerd, everything is just not working," Mirkin said.

American actress Michelle Pfeiffer provided the voice of Mindy Simmons in the episode. All the writers showed up at the recording studio in West Los Angeles to see her record her lines. When Pfeiffer entered the room with her daughter, Pfeiffer was "mobbed" by the energy of the writers and directors, who were excited to see her. Mirkin, who directed Pfeiffer in the studio, was nervous because he thought she was a beautiful woman who was on a "completely different level" than the other actors and actresses he had directed on the show. Pfeiffer was also nervous because she had never voiced an animated character. Mirkin told her: "You're gonna love this more than anything you have ever done because it's calm and pleasant, and we have so much time to play and experiment." This helped her calm down and by the end of the session, she was "really relaxed" and they had a "fantastic" time.

Silverman told Pfeiffer to not sound too flirty, and that she should just act herself. In one scene in the episode, Mindy drools as she eats doughnuts, much like Homer does. To get the right drool sound, Pfeiffer put broccoli and water in her mouth. Mirkin said he did not have to give much direction during the recording of Homer and Mindy's final scene together, in which Mindy tells Homer how she feels about him. Pfeiffer "hit it really well" and they did it several times to get it "more and more real". Mirkin also thought that Pfeiffer completely understood the part and played it perfectly. He described her as "one of those actresses that you don't even have to see to know they're great, instead you can hear from her voice what a brilliant actress she is." Dan Castellaneta was also praised by Mirkin for his performance as Homer. Castellaneta struggled to be "sweet" and "moving" in his performance.

When Homer calls a marriage counseling hotline in the episode, he accidentally knocks himself unconscious in the phone booth. In a dream, he is approached by his guardian angel. The angel initially takes the form of Isaac Newton, but since Homer has no idea who that is, instead takes the form of Colonel Klink, then shows Homer what his life would be like without Marge (in the style of It's A Wonderful Life). Colonel Klink is a character on the American television series Hogan's Heroes. Klink's actor in Hogan's Heroes, Werner Klemperer, provided the voice of Klink in this episode. Mirkin said Klemperer was a "fantastic sport" to do the character. Since Hogan's Heroes had gone off the air in 1971, he had forgotten how to play Klink. Mirkin therefore had to do an impression of Klink that Klemperer could imitate to get it right. This cameo was Klemperer's last credited role before his death in 2000.

Cultural references
The title is a reference to the 1988 film "The Last Temptation of Christ". When Homer first meets Mindy, he imagines her as Venus in Sandro Botticelli's painting The Birth of Venus. To deal with Homer and Mindy charging room service to the company, Mr. Burns unleashes flying monkeys in the manner of the Wicked Witch of the West, as seen in the 1939 film The Wizard of Oz. However, the attempt fails as the monkeys all fall to their deaths. The scene where Homer meets his guardian angel in the guise of Isaac Newton (who changes into Colonel Klink from Hogan's Heroes because Homer has no idea who Newton is), wondering what his life would have been like if he married Mindy and not Marge, draws from the films It's A Wonderful Life and A Christmas Carol. When Homer meets Mindy in the elevator, he thinks "unsexy thoughts" to avoid being seduced by her. He imagines Barney in a bikini and humming the theme tune to the American sitcom I Dream of Jeannie. At home, Homer watches a TV show about the 'secret affairs' of Kennedy, Eisenhower, Bush and Clinton. Homer attempts to read the notes for Mindy that he wrote on his hand, but they have smeared out because of sweat. In his attempt, Homer unknowingly babbles the Nam Myoho Renge Kyo, a Japanese Buddhist chant in Nichiren Buddhism and Soka Gakkai. This is a reference to an Akbar and Jeff cartoon, written by Matt Groening, in which the same mantra is used. When Homer notices the sweat, he says he is "sweating like [film critic] Roger Ebert". In the bathroom, Homer sings a rough version of the song "Mandy" by Barry Manilow, replacing "Mandy" with "Mindy"; when Homer panics upon realizing Lisa heard him singing and tries to cover the song up, Lisa glumly says "It sounds like you're infatuated with a woman named Mindy. (pause) Or a man named Andy." Homer refers to comic strip Ziggy when he wonders if Mindy agrees the title character has become "too preachy". Barry White's song "Can't Get Enough of Your Love, Babe" is played in the episode's final scene where Homer and Marge make out at the hotel room.

Reception

Critical reception
Since airing, the episode has received mostly positive reviews from television critics.

In 2003, it was placed tenth on Entertainment Weekly's top 25 The Simpsons episode list, and The Daily Telegraph characterized the episode as one of "The 10 Best Simpsons Television Episodes".

Nancy Basile of About.com named it one of her top twenty favorite episodes of the show, and said Michelle Pfeiffer "is so elegant and beautiful, that the irony of her playing a burping love interest for Homer Simpson is funny enough." She added "the thorny issue of adultery is tackled in a way only The Simpsons could," and "though Homer is contemplating cheating, he's a sympathetic and almost innocent character."

During a review of the 2008 episode "Dangerous Curves", Robert Canning of IGN called the episode "smart, touching and funny", and said "it did a great job showing Homer's struggle to deal with the flirtations of a co-worker."

The authors of the book I Can't Believe It's a Bigger and Better Updated Unofficial Simpsons Guide, Warren Martyn and Adrian Wood, called it a "wonderfully scripted episode".

DVD Movie Guide's Colin Jacobson said, "Given Homer’s utter devotion to Marge, it may seem off-character for him to fall for Mindy, but the show makes it fit, as his obsession doesn’t come across as inconsistent." He added the plot with Bart becoming a nerd is the "funnier one" of the two.

Bill Gibron of DVD Talk called it a "jest fest loaded with insight into the human heart and hilarious over-the-top goofiness."

TV DVD Reviews's Kay Daly called it the season's finest episode with the "greatest foray into emotional resonance". Matt Groening thought it was an amazing episode with "a lot of fun" in it. David Mirkin said Frank Mula's script was great.

In a 2008 article, Entertainment Weekly named Pfeiffer's role as Mindy one of the 16 best guest appearances on The Simpsons. She also appeared on AOL's list of their top favorite guest stars on the show. Brett Buckalew of Metromix Indianapolis wrote that Pfeiffer "gives arguably the best celebrity guest-vocal performance in series history." Total Film'''s Nathan Ditum ranked her performance as the 15th best guest appearance in the show's history.

When the inspectors visit the plant, they mention finding an entire Brazilian soccer team working there, and Burns says that they have to because their plane crashed on his property. This scene was mentioned by various media outlets after the 2016 disaster that killed most players on the Brazilian team Chapecoense.

Ratings
In its original American broadcast, "The Last Temptation of Homer" finished 24th (tied with The Fresh Prince of Bel Air'') in the ratings for the week of December 6–12, 1993. It acquired a Nielsen rating of 12.7. The episode was the highest-rated show on the Fox network that week.

References

External links

The Simpsons (season 5) episodes
1993 American television episodes
Television episodes about adultery
Cultural depictions of Isaac Newton